is a former racing driver and team owner from Japan. He started racing motocross when he was 15 years old. In 1964 he signed to drive for Nissan. After establishing himself in saloon car and GT races in Japan, he participated in his only Formula One race at the 1976 Japanese Grand Prix for Kojima on 24 October 1976. He qualified 10th after an error which cost him his chance of a pole position and finished 11th, seven laps behind the winner. Contrary to a widely propagated but mistaken result, however, he never set a fastest lap in a Formula One championship race. Along with compatriots Noritake Takahara and Kazuyoshi Hoshino, he was the first Japanese driver to start a Formula One Grand Prix.

Hasemi became the Japanese Formula 2 champion in 1980, and got two titles in the Fuji Grand Champion Series in 1974 and 1980. After that he reverted to racing Skylines, which he became heavily synonymous with in Group 5, touring cars and JGTC. He won the Japanese Touring Car Championship in 1989, 1991 and 1992. He also won the All Japan Sports Prototype Championship in 1990, with the controversial win at the Guia Touring Car race at the Macau Grand Prix in 1990 and Daytona 24 hour in 1992. Hasemi retired from driving in 2001 and now runs NDDP Racing, a Super GT team that currently competes in the GT500 class. Hasemi also owns Hasemi Sport, a former Super GT racing team that ran under the Hasemi Motorsport banner and Nissan aftermarket parts company.

Hasemi is the most recent Japanese driver to win his home Grand Prix, winning it in 1975, when it was a non-championship race.

Racing record

Japanese Top Formula Championship results
(key)

Complete Formula One results
(key)

Complete JTC/JTCC results
(key) (Races in bold indicate pole position) (Races in italics indicate fastest lap)

Complete JGTC results
(key) (Races in bold indicate pole position) (Races in italics indicate fastest lap)

Complete Bathurst 1000 results

24 Hours of Le Mans results

Note on fastest lap in Formula One 
It was initially announced that Hasemi set the fastest lap at the 1976 Japanese Grand Prix, but it was a measurement mistake, and, several days later, the circuit issued a press release to correct the fastest lap holder of the race to Jacques Laffite. This press release was promptly made known in Japan, and the Japan Automobile Federation (JAF) and Japanese media corrected the record. But this correction was not made well known outside Japan, thus, Hasemi is credited with one fastest lap in many record books.

References

External links
 Masahiro Hasemi profile at the Japan Automobile Federation
 Hasemi Sport Deals with Nissan aftermarket parts (Japanese)
 Kojima F1 Project 1976 Japanese Grand prix page, partially dedicated to Hasemi-san and the car
 Gzox Hasemi's Super GT sponsor's page (Japanese)
 Team profile

Japanese racing drivers
Japanese Formula One drivers
Kojima Formula One drivers
Japanese Formula Two Championship drivers
Japanese Formula 3000 Championship drivers
Japanese Touring Car Championship drivers
1945 births
Living people
24 Hours of Le Mans drivers
24 Hours of Daytona drivers
World Sportscar Championship drivers
Grand Champion Series drivers
Long Distance Series drivers
Australian Endurance Championship drivers
Nismo drivers